The 1953 Southern League was the second season of the regional third tier of speedway racing in the United Kingdom for Southern British teams. It was the final season before being replaced by the Southern Area League. 

From the previous season, Aldershot Shots dropped out, Wolverhampton Wasps moved up and Oxford Cheetahs came down to replace them.

Summary
Rayleigh Rockets were champions for a second consecutive season whilst Cardiff Dragons withdrew mid-season. Goog Hoskin of Exeter topped the averages.

Final table

Withdrawal (Record expunged) : Cardiff Dragons

Leading Averages

See also
List of United Kingdom Speedway League Champions
Knockout Cup (speedway)

References

Speedway Southern League
1953 in British motorsport
1953 in speedway